The discography of Canadian folk rock/alternative rock band Crash Test Dummies consists of eight primary studio albums, 23 singles, one live album, a greatest hits compilation, and two video releases. This list does not include material recorded by band members individually or with other side projects.

Crash Test Dummies is most identifiable through Brad Roberts' distinctive bass-baritone voice, and the backing/occasional lead vocals of Ellen Reid. During its heyday, the band consisted of Roberts, Ellen Reid (co-vocals, keyboards), Brad's brother Dan Roberts (bass guitar), Benjamin Darvill (harmonica, mandolin), and Mitch Dorge (drums, percussion). Today, only Brad Roberts and Ellen Reid have appeared on every album, while Dan Roberts still occasionally tours with the band.  Mitch Dorge has been busy working with Tuesday's Girl and Charlie Redstar, along with his own projects since 2002. Benjamin Darvill has been busy with his solo project Son of Dave since 2000 and is unlikely to play with the band again, since he now lives in London.

Albums

Pre-label releases
The band released two demo tapes.  Both feature songs that would eventually appear on their debut album, as well as two songs that were never featured on future releases.

Studio albums
The band's first four albums were released by BMG, while subsequent albums were released on Brad Roberts' own label Cha-Ching/Deep Fried Records.

Themed/topical albums
The band released a single Christmas album in October 2002.

Compilation albums
Crash Test Dummies released a greatest hits compilation in 2007, followed by a compilation of unreleased demos in 2011.

Live albums
In 2001 Brad Roberts released a live album, which consists of Crash Test Dummies songs, along with various covers.

EPs
From 2007 to 2009, Crash Test Dummies released a collection of four songs for purchase via their online store about Brad Roberts' experiences within Cape Breton.

Singles

Other songs

Songs recorded for non-album use
"The First Noel", on A Lump of Coal and the B-side to "Androgynous" CD single.
"The Ballad of Peter Pumpkinhead" (XTC cover), on Dumb and Dumber soundtrack (1995) and released as a single.
"All You Pretty Girls" (XTC cover), on A Testimonial Dinner: The Songs of XTC (1995) and released as the B-side to "My Own Sunrise".
"One Of Us", leaked acoustic demo recorded in 1994. Originally written with Brad Roberts in mind, but he ultimately did not record a full version of it.
"Handy Candyman", on "Keep a Lid on Things" single (1999) and Give Yourself a Hand (Japanese CD).
"Filter Queen", on "Keep a Lid on Things" single (1999)
"Party's Over", on "Get You in the Morning" single (1999)

Videography

DVD and video releases
 Symptomology of a Rock Band: The Case of Crash Test Dummies (Music video compilation/rockumentary)
 Crash Test Dude (Brad Roberts rockumentary)

Music videos

References

Discographies of Canadian artists
Rock music group discographies
Discography